"'Hurting'" is a song written and performed by Canadian singer Karl Wolf from his third studio album, Nightlife. A remix version of the song that features Sway, was released as the official single. It was a hit for him on the Canadian Hot 100 charts in 2010 making its debut on the chart dated on March 20, 2010. It has been going up the charts to reach #55 on the chart dated on the issue of April 17, 2010.

Music video
The music video was shot for the original version of the song. The story line depicts Karl Wolf as a boxer and his love object and her rejection which causes his heartbreak. The female role is played by Nicole Holness. For his boxing scenes, Karl Wolf was trained by Howard Grant and Otis Grant makes a cameo appearance during the fight commenting on the game, Many boxing scenes were filmed in TKO Fightclub and the Grant Brothers Gym.

The music video was directed by Karl Wolf himself and produced by Radar Films and Lone Wolf Entertainment with Michel Grondin as executive producer and Denis Filion as production manager. Bernard Couture was director of photography and Gregory Nowak as artistic director.

Chart

2010 singles
Karl Wolf songs
2009 songs